Darren Miller is a fictional character from the British soap opera EastEnders

Darren Miller may also refer to:
Darren Millar (born 1976), Welsh politician
Darren Miller (priest) (born 1967), British priest